Murder of Nicole Brown Simpson may refer to:

O. J. Simpson murder case, in which Simpson was accused of the murder of Nicole Brown Simpson
The Murder of Nicole Brown Simpson, a 2019 film